Lesson of the Season is an EP by Bunkface, released in December 2007 on their own budget. This EP represents the band's first release of songs. The song "Silly Lily" was number 1 on Hitz.fm's Malaysian Top Ten for 8 weeks and number 1 on Fly.fm's Campur Chart for 10 weeks. "Silly Lily" was the first song they made.

Track listing

Personnel
 Sam - vocals, rhythm guitar
 Youk - back-up vocals, bass
 Paan - back-up vocals, lead guitar
 Biak - drums, percussion

References

External links
 Bunkface's Official Website @ Myspace
  https://web.archive.org/web/20111123173814/http://www.bunkfaceband.com/

2007 debut EPs
Bunkface EPs